Nippononebria changbaiensis is a species of metallic green coloured ground beetle from Nebriinae subfamily that is endemic to Jilin province of China.

Distribution

References

Beetles described in 2010
Beetles of Asia
Endemic fauna of China